Clay Cross Town F.C. was the name of an English football club based in Clay Cross, Derbyshire.

History 
The club was formed in the 1870s and competed in the FA Cup on three occasions in the 1890s before folding.

They were the first of three prominent clubs to take the name of Clay Cross Town, the second was formed in 1909, and the third in 2010.

Records 
FA Cup
 2nd qualifying round – 1893–94

References 

Defunct football clubs in Derbyshire
Defunct football clubs in England
Association football clubs established in 1874
Association football clubs disestablished in 1896